Jan Paweł Ziobro (born 4 September 1989) is a Polish politician.

Biography
He was born on 4 September 1989. Ziobro graduated from the Kraków University of Economics in 2011. He subsequently became employed at one of Kraków's banks. Ziobro served as the chairman of the regional structures of the Law and Justice Youth Forum. In 2010 he unsuccessfully ran for councilor in Wieliczka County. In 2011 Ziobro was elected as a Member of the Sejm. He was the youngest parliamentarian.

References

1989 births
Living people
Members of the Polish Sejm 2011–2015
Kraków University of Economics
Politicians from Kraków
United Poland politicians